Cell division cycle protein 123 homolog is a protein that in humans is encoded by the CDC123 gene.

References

External links

Further reading